Drury Lane may refer to:

 Drury Lane, a street in London.
 Theatre Royal, Drury Lane, a theatre on the above street, itself commonly known simply as Drury Lane.
 Drury Lane (character), a character created by Ellery Queen, writing as Barnaby Ross.
 Drury Lane Theatre (Illinois), a group of six theatres in the Chicago area founded by Tony DeSantis.
 Drury Lane Water Tower Place, the newest of Chicago's Drury Lane Theatres, built in 2004.